Epipremnum papuanum is a flowering plant belonging to the genus Epipremnum, and the family Araceae. It exhibits liana growth style.

Distribution 
It is native to the isle of New Guinea.

Description 
It is an evergreen perennial vine, which climbs structures like trees with the help of aerial roots, with simple or pinnate leaves (see glossary of leaf morphology) and flowers within green spathes, but these flowers are not normally seen in cultivated plants as they simply do not have the right conditions for growth.

References 

papuanum
Flora of New Guinea